Tommaso Cancelloni (born 5 March 1992) is an Italian former professional footballer who played as a defender. He played for several clubs throughout his career, including the Italian national side; he is currently the champion of the "Associazione Polisportiva Dilettantistica Magione (APD)". He is currently a political science student.

Career
Born in Perugia, Umbria, Cancelloni started his career at hometown club Perugia. on 31 August 2009 he was signed by Serie B club Grosseto in temporary deal. The deal became definitive in summer 2010. He was a member of the reserve team of Grosseto from 2009 to 2011. In 2011 Cancelloni was signed by the reserve team of Gubbio.

In summer 2012 Cancelloni became a trialist of Foligno. He was a substitute against former club Gubbio in a pre-season friendly. However at the start of season he was signed by Serie C2 club Milazzo.

Parma
In January 2013 he was signed by Serie A club Parma on free transfer in a -year contract. He was farmed to Savona immediately along with former Grosseto youth product Aracu and La Rosa, all from Parma.

In summer 2013 Cancelloni was signed by Rimini. On 22 August 2014, Cancelloni left for Paganese in another temporary deal, re-joining Parma "team-mate" Bussi, Caccavallo, Deli and Tartaglia.

He joined Serie D side Gualdo for the 2015–16 season.

References

External links
 AIC profile (data by football.it) 
 
 Eurosport Profile

Living people
1992 births
Sportspeople from Perugia
Footballers from Umbria
Association football defenders
Italian footballers
A.C. Perugia Calcio players
F.C. Grosseto S.S.D. players
A.S. Gubbio 1910 players
S.S. Milazzo players
Savona F.B.C. players
Rimini F.C. 1912 players
Paganese Calcio 1926 players
Serie C players